Lower Silesia Province may refer to:
Lower Silesian Voivodeship, a province in present-day Poland
Lower Silesia Province (Prussia), a former province of Germany